The 2018 Arctic Race of Norway was a four-stage cycling stage race that took place in Norway between 16 and 19 August. It was the sixth edition of the Arctic Race of Norway and is rated as a 2.HC event as part of the UCI Europe Tour.

Race schedule

Teams 

19 teams were invited to take part in the race. Five of these were UCI WorldTeams; 12 were UCI Professional Continental teams; four were UCI Continental teams. Each team was allowed to enter six riders, three teams only entered five, therefore the peloton at the start of the race was made up of 123 riders.

Stages

Stage 1 

16 August 2018 – Vadsø to Kirkenes,

Stage 2 

17 August 2018 – Tana to Kjøllefjord,

Stage 3 

18 August 2018 – Honningsvåg to Hammerfest,

Stage 4 

19 August 2018 – Kvalsund to Alta,

Classifications 

The race included four main classifications: the general classification, the points classification, the mountains classification and the youth classification. There was also an award for the most aggressive rider on each stage and a team classification.

Notes

External links 
 

Arctic Race of Norway
Arctic Race of Norway
Arctic Race of Norway
Arctic Race of Norway